Neef House may refer to:

Frederick W. Neef House, listed on the National Register of Historic Places {NRHP)
Henry B. Neef House, in Minne Lusa neighborhood of North Omaha, Nebraska, NRHP-listed